Willingham may refer to the following places or persons.

Places 
 Willingham, Cambridgeshire
 Willingham by Stow, Lincolnshire
 Willingham St Mary, Suffolk
 Cherry Willingham, Lincolnshire
 North Willingham, West Lindsey, Lincolnshire, England
 South Willingham, East Lindsey district of Lincolnshire, England

People 
 Bill Willingham (born 1956), American comic book writer and artist
 Calder Willingham (1922–1995), American writer
 Cameron Todd Willingham (1968–2004), American executed in Texas in 2004
 Daniel T. Willingham (born 1961), American cognitive psychologist
 Emily Willingham (born 1968), American autism activist and blogger
 Hugh Willingham (1906–1988), American baseball player
 Josh Willingham (born 1979), American baseball player
 Kamilah Willingham, American activist
 Noble Willingham (1931–2004), American actor
 Shelly Willingham (born 1943), American politician
 Travis Willingham (born 1981), American voice actor
 Tyrone Willingham (born 1953), American college football coach